Momčilo Grgurević (1906 - 1945) was a Serbian orthodox priest of the Metropolitanate of Dabar-Bosnia who was canonized as a martyr.

Biography 
Grgurević was born in 1906 in Foča (today in Republika Srpska). He graduated from the Faculty of Theology in Sarajevo in 1928.

In 1929, was ordained to the rank of deacon and soon to the rank of priest. He served in Čelebići until his martyrdom on 29 November 1945.

During the genocide of Serbs in the Independent State of Croatia in World War II, his liquidation was repeatedly planned and attempted.

He was killed on the night of 29 November 1945. There are two different versions of how he was killed. According to one version of the events, Grgurević was wounded by a trio of Ustaše who then slit his throat. Another version posits that he was still alive when he was wounded and that his head was decapitated by a hacksaw. His head was then taken as a trophy and thrown inside the municipal building in Čelebići.

After 45 years, his son Vasilije transferred Momcilo's earthly remains and buried them next to the Church in Čelebići.

References

Literature
 Savo B. Jović, "Imprisoned Church", The Suffering of the Clergy of the Serbian Orthodox Church from 1945 to 1985

External links

 Svetitelji Mitropolije dabrobosanske
 Sveti mučenici Mitropolije dabrobosanske

Serbian saints of the Eastern Orthodox Church
1945 deaths
20th-century Eastern Orthodox martyrs
People from Čapljina
New Martyrs
Persecution of Serbs
People executed by the Independent State of Croatia
People murdered in the Independent State of Croatia
Serbian people who died in the Holocaust
Deaths by blade weapons
1906 births
Serbs of Bosnia and Herzegovina